"Cruel" is a song by British production duo Snakehips featuring English singer and songwriter Zayn. It was released as a single on 15 July 2016 by Sony Music UK and Columbia Records. The song was written and composed by Oliver Lee and James Carter of Snakehips, along with Cass Lowe, Erik Hassle and Zayn. "Cruel" received critical acclaim, with NME ranking the song at number 50 on their "50 Best Tracks of 2016" list, and MuuMuse ranking it at number 88 on their "Top 100 Singles of 2016" list.

Music video 
An accompanying music video for "Cruel" premiered on YouTube on 9 August 2016 and stars Zayn as he sings the song inside a building in an Asian town. The video was directed by Alex Southam.

Charts

Weekly charts

Year-end charts

Certifications

Release history

References

2016 singles
2016 songs
Snakehips (duo) songs
Songs written by Cass Lowe
Songs written by Zayn Malik
Songs written by Erik Hassle
Sony Music UK singles
Columbia Records singles
Torch songs